Kirkland is a ghost town in southeastern Childress County, Texas, near US-287 and 8 miles Southeast of the modern city of Childress, Texas. The population was 44 the last time the official state map was published.

History
The first townsite of Kirkland was actually in Hardeman county along a stage coach line from Wichita Falls to Mobeetie, but with the arrival of the Fort Worth & Denver City railroad in 1887, the settlement moved to its present location. At its previous location, it had "an inn, two saloons and a general store."

Settler John Quincy Adams, along whose land the FW&D tracks were laid, platted a well-gridded townsite that soon became home to a mercantile store, a post office and a stockyard serving an ever increasing number of farmers. The panic of 1893 was a setback to Kirkland, but by 1900 growth resumed, and by 1905 Crone Webster Furr had established a mercantile store that became the beginnings of the Furr's Groceries and Cafeterias corporation. Roy Furr worked those stores as a boy, and as a man would expand the business in to an empire. By the 1920s, "the Biggest Little City in Texas" had "three churches, a three-room school, and several businesses, including three grocery stores, two lumber yards, two barber shops, five filling stations, three hardware stores, and a bank".

From here, however, the decline began, and by 1980, the once-proud community had only one general store and 100 inhabitants, when previously it had 500. Today, the only significant remnants of the town are a (now dirt) street grid, a few houses and a cemetery.

Kirkland Cemetery
Located approximately half a mile from the current Kirkland town site, the Kirkland cemetery is two long wooded savannahs of marble headstones along a dirt road, containing the last earthly remains of citizens all the way back to 1908. The land the cemetery sits on was donated by James William Sharp sometime before March of 1908. James W Sharp, his first wife Alberta, as well as two children are of the 725 well-marked gravestones that stand on this site. There are also 45 veterans, including 7 Confederate Veterans of the Civil War, 10 WWI Veterans, 22 WWII Veterans, 3 Korean War Veterans, and 3 Vietnam War Veterans.

References

Ghost towns in Texas
Ghost towns in North Texas